Aluru (ah-LOO-roo) is a town in Alur Mandal in the Kurnool district of Andhra Pradesh in India. Alur Assembly Segment is a part of Kurnool Parliamentary segment.

Temples 

There are two well-known temples in Aluru. The Lord Navanepattayya Swamy Temple is famous for the modern-looking Lord Sai Baba of Shirdi Temple, located near National Highway 167 in the centre of the town. The temple provides financial resources to support the village's many schools.

The Anjaneya Swamy Temple is a forest temple located just outside Aluru. Hindus often use it as a site for marriages and/or other celebrations. Hindus who use this temple are typically from Aluru.

Demographics 
As of 2011 census, the town had a population of 14,426.

Education 
The primary and secondary school education is imparted by government, aided and private schools, under the School Education Department of the state. The medium of instruction followed by different schools are English, Telugu.

Transport 
Aluru is situated on Kurnool-Ballari Highway. And also on Guntakal-Adoni Highway.

Aluru can also  be reached by taking the National Highway 167 which connects to Ballari - Jadcherla - Kodad. This road goes through Aluru.

NH 167 Route> 
Ballari road at NH 67 ↔ Alur ↔ Adoni ↔ Raichur ↔ Mahabubnagar ↔ Jadcherla NH 44 ↔ Kalwakurthy ↔ Devarakonda ↔ Miryalaguda ↔ Kodad NH 65

Distance to Major towns and cities 

 Kurnool = 103 km
 Adoni = 28 km
 Nandyal = 180 km
 Guntakal = 31 km
 Pattikonda = 38 km
 Mantralayam = 77 km
 Ballari = 46 km
 Raichur = 103 km
 Anantapuramu = 105 km
 Hyderabad = 310 km
 Bengaluru = 321 km
 Vijayawada = 445 km
 Chennai = 483 km
 Kadapa = 242 km

References 

Villages in Kurnool district